C Spire, formerly known as  Cellular South, Inc., is a privately owned technology company headquartered in Ridgeland, Mississippi. The company consists of three business divisions – C Spire Wireless, C Spire Home Fiber, and C Spire Business.

C Spire Wireless operates more than 1,200 cell sites with 9,000 route miles of buried fiber optic cable. C Spire owns and has access to low, mid and high-band wireless spectrum in its primary service areas. The unit offers 4G LTE mobile services and is investing for 5G, the next generation of cellular service. C Spire has customers in Mississippi, the Memphis Metropolitan Area, the Florida Panhandle, and parts of Alabama including Mobile. C Spire sells plans and devices for prepaid and postpaid customers and was the first wireless carrier to offer free incoming calls to those customers.

C Spire Home Fiber, which launched one of the nation's first Gigabit speed Fiber to the Home efforts in 2013, provides 1,000 Megabits per second residential fiber internet access for thousands of consumers in Mississippi and Alabama.  

C Spire Business offers VoIP business phone systems, cloud services, network solutions, as well as IT hardware and software platforms for businesses. 

C Spire is owned by the holding company Telapex, Inc., which also owns Telepak Networks, Inc., and several smaller Mississippi telecoms.

Growth and recognition
Since 1999, C Spire has invested more than US$700 million in its wireless network, including constructing 1,403 cell sites, a high-speed wireless broadband network and a permanent microwave ring for redundancy across the Gulf Coast region. In January 2021, the company announced it would be investing US$1 billion over four years to deploy broadband internet to serve more than 200,000 homes and businesses in Mississippi and Alabama and support the expansion of 5G access.

In 2006 the firm opened its first sales center outside of its native network footprint. In 2009, the company purchased Alabama-based Corr Wireless, which expanded its coverage in Alabama and moved it into Georgia for the first time (in 2013 Corr Wireless was subsequently sold to AT&T).

The company's wireless division announced on September 22, 2011 that it planned on rebranding from Cellular South to C Spire Wireless to be put into effect on September 26 of that year.

In 2018, the company purchased Teklinks, based in Birmingham, Alabama, to expand their footprint in the commercial and enterprise business, as well as their geographical footprint in the southeast.

In Oct. 2019, C Spire launched C Spire Health, a mobile app to provide health care for people in Mississippi, especially those in rural and under served areas, with minor ailments.

C Spire announced a partnership with Alabama Power on Dec. 5, 2019, to bring Gigabit speed (1000 Mbit/s) internet services to the Birmingham area, as well as Shelby County and other parts of Alabama, in 2020. C Spire is a member of the Alabama Rural Broadband Coalition (ARBC), which is focused on rural broadband expansion. As part of the ARBC, C Spire also will be helping expand rural broadband access to Jasper, Alabama, in 2020.

In July 2021, C Spire completed the acquisition of Harbor Communications. With this acquisition, the company is providing fiber-based broadband internet access and related services to several cities and towns in Mobile and Baldwin counties on Alabama's Gulf Coast. 

In October 2021, C Spire announced it will acquire Alabama-based telecommunications provider Troy Cablevision in a deal subject to regulatory approval. Troy Cablevision was founded in 1985 and offers cable, internet and other services to businesses and residents in Pike, Coffee, Crenshaw and Dale counties. It has offices in Troy, Elba, Enterprise, Luverne and Ozark.

History
Cellular South, Inc. began its wireless service on the Mississippi Gulf Coast on February 4, 1988, using AMPS technology. Former football quarterback Archie Manning made the company's inaugural call from Gulfport, Mississippi to then U.S. Representative Trent Lott in Washington, D.C.

In 2011, C Spire became the fourth wireless carrier in the U.S., behind AT&T, Sprint and Verizon and ahead of T-Mobile, to be able to sell the iPhone.

In 2013, C Spire created Vu Digital, LLC as a wholly owned subsidiary. The name "Vu" is pronounced "view" and is inspired by the phrase "your view of things". Vu is used as a web content aggregator with heuristics, allowing it to improve its aggregation selections based on user preferences. Its initial product was "a cloud-based digital profiling and analytics system" that provided "web personalization". Digital announced Video-To-Data analysis and metadata tagging in May 2015. Vu Video-to-Data (V2D) translates video images and audio to text, affording video producers the ability to tag their content with metadata making it more searchable.

Network

Radio frequency summary 

The following is a list of known LTE and NR frequency bands which C Spire employs. 2G/3G CDMA was discontinued in 2022.

References

Madison County, Mississippi
Companies based in Mississippi
Economy of the Southeastern United States
Mobile phone companies of the United States
Telecommunications companies of the United States
Companies established in 1988